UPJ may refer to:
Union of Progressive Jews in Germany
University of Pittsburgh at Johnstown
Upjohn, stock ticker symbol
Ureteropelvic junction (also "ureteral pelvic junction")